Union was launched at Liverpool in 1805. She made three voyages as a slave ship in the triangular trade in enslaved people. She transported at least 743 captives to the West Indies and South Carolina. After the end of British participation in the trans-Atlantic slave trade she then became a West Indiaman.  Union was last listed in the mid-1820s.

Career
Union first appeared in Lloyd's Register (LR) in 1805.

1st enslaving voyage (1805–1806): Captain Joseph Tucker sailed from Liverpool on 18 March 1805. Union acquired captives in the Congo River region and arrived with 243 captives at Suriname on 7 October 1805. She sailed from Suriname on 27 February 1806, and arrived back at Liverpool on 14 April. She had left Liverpool with 41 crew members and had suffered five crew deaths on her voyage.

2nd enslaving voyage (1806–1807): Captain Tucker sailed from Liverpool on 9 June 1806. Union gathered captives in the Congo River region and arrived with 312 captives on 28 November 1806 at Charleston. 

In December 1803, the South Carolina General Assembly voted to reopen the African slave trade. Concern with the spread of yellow fever had caused the Assembly to suspend the slave trade. The Medical Society of South Carolina relaxed quarantine measures, prioritizing reopening the slave trade over public health. The Medical Society argued that the fever was not imported (correct), and not contagious. Later it was discovered that the disease was not directly contagious, but was mosquito-borne, and so indirectly contagious, and that quarantine would help reduce the spread. 

Union left Charleston on 26 January 1807 and arrived back at Liverpool on 19 March. She had left Liverpool with 36 crew members and had suffered two crew deaths on her voyage.

The act for the abolition of the slave trade had passed Parliament and had received Royal Assent in March 1807. It took effect on 1 May 1807. However, vessels that had before 1 May received clearance to sail were still permitted to still sail.

3rd enslaving voyage (1807–1808): Captain Tucker sailed from Liverpool on 25 May 1807. Union acquired captives at Cape Coast Castle and Accra, and arrived on 16 February 1808 at Kingston with 228 captives. She sailed from Kingston on 7 July, and arrived back at Liverpool on 16 August. She had left Liverpool with 38 crew members and had suffered seven crew deaths on her voyage.

Union then became a West Indiaman.

Captain James Phillips acquired a letter of marque on 10 October 1808.

Captain John Brown acquired a letter of marque on 19 October 1809.

Lloyd's Register carried Union with unchanged data until 1826. The Register of Shipping (RS) had discrepant data.

This data continued unchanged until the Register of Shipping last listed Union in 1824.

Citations

References
 

1805 ships
Liverpool slave ships
Merchant ships of the United Kingdom
Age of Sail merchant ships